Södertuna is a medieval castle located on a small island in Lake Frösjön in Gnesta Municipality, Sweden. It dates to the 14th century and is now a luxury hotel and conference center. The main building is of medieval origin, but was updated during the 17th century and the late 18th century. The last major renovation was in 1892.

It has belonged to members of several families: Sparre, Lovisin, Palmenfelt, Ehrensvard, Wachtmeister, Adelborg, and von Eckermann.

The castle and the park were split off in 1985 by the von Eckermann family. The new owners, together with an additional couple of Norwegian investors, made the palace into a hotel and conference center, which was inaugurated in 1986 by Princess Christina. In 2007 the castle was sold to the Åström family, which also operates Dufweholms Manor Inn and Gripsholm.

See also
List of castles and palaces in Sweden

References

Castles in Södermanland County
Hotels in Sweden
Hotels established in 1986